The PFL 6 mixed martial arts event for the 2021 season of the Professional Fighters League was held on June 25, 2021. This was the third regular season event of the tournament and included fights in the Heavyweight and women's Lightweight divisions. This event will aire on ESPN2, with the prelims on ESPN+.

Background
The event was headlined by Two-time Olympic gold medalist Kayla Harrison and Cindy Dandois.

The co-main was to be a bout between 2019 Professional Fighters League season Heavyweight Champion Ali Isaev against Renan Ferreira. Ali Isaev was forced to withdraw from the event after not being medically cleared to compete. Stepping in for Isaev to fight Renan Ferreira was PFL newcomer Stuart Austin. Austin however was pulled from the bout due to unknown reasons and replaced by returning PFL fighter, Carl Seumanutafa.

A heavyweight bout between Ante Delija and Hatef Moeil was scheduled for this event. However, Moeil had to pull out and was replaced by Chandler Cole.

A bout between heavyweight alternates Klidson Abreu and Jamelle Jones also took place on the card.

A bout between Fabrício Werdum and Brandon Sayles was expected to take place at this event. However, Werdum had to pull out off the bout after suffering injuries from his last bout.

A lightweight bout between former UFC and WEC Lightweight champion Anthony Pettis and undefeated Alexander Martinez was expected to take place at PFL 4. However, Pettis withdrew due to illness and Martinez was scheduled to face Natan Schulte. Schulte's opponent Raush Manfio - who replaced an injured Mikhail Odintsov - faced Pettis at this event.

Movlid Khaybulaev and Lance Palmer were scheduled bouts at PFL 4 against Sheymon Moraes and Jesse Stirn respectively. However, both were pulled from their bouts and rescheduled against each other at this event.

At weigh-ins, Olena Kolesnyk came in at 157.6 lb, 1.6 pounds heavy for her lightweight bout against Larissa Pacheco. As a result, Kolesnyk was docked one point, fined 20 percent of her purse, lost one playoff point and was deemed ineligible to win playoff points should she prevail. Pacheco automatically earned three playoff points, with the ability to gain more by scoring a finish.

Results

Standings After Event 
The PFL points system is based on results of the match.  The winner of a fight receives 3 points.  If the fight ends in a draw, both fighters will receive 1 point. The bonus for winning a fight in the first, second, or third round is 3 points, 2 points, and 1 point respectively. The bonus for winning in the third round requires a fight be stopped before 4:59 of the third round.  No bonus point will be awarded if a fighter wins via decision.  For example, if a fighter wins a fight in the first round, then the fighter will receive 6 total points. A decision win will result in three total points.  If a fighter misses weight, the opponent (should they comply with weight limits) will receive 3 points due to a walkover victory, regardless of winning or losing the bout, with the fighter who missed weight being deducted 1 standings point;  if the non-offending fighter subsequently wins with a stoppage, all bonus points will be awarded. A fighter who was unable to compete for any reason, will receive a 1-point penalty (-1 point in the standings). The fighters who made weight will not receive a walkover, but will earn points and contracted purse amounts based on their performance in the altered matchup.

Heavyweight

Lightweight

Women's Lightweight

Featherweight

♛ = Clinched playoff spot

E = Eliminated

See also 
List of PFL events
List of current PFL fighters

References

Professional Fighters League
2021 in mixed martial arts
June 2021 sports events in the United States
Events in Atlantic City, New Jersey